International Mutual Aid (IMA) is a Maryland 501(c)(3) registered nonprofit organization working to provide disaster and emergency medical assistance to underserved populations outside of the US.
 
International Mutual Aid was founded in November 2014 in response to the Ebola virus epidemic in West Africa. IMA deployed a medical team to Kono District, Sierra Leone in December 2014.

This team remained in place for the duration of the Kono Ebola epidemic, coordinating with local resources to run a free primary care clinic, conduct Ebola surveillance, contact tracing, initial treatment for suspect Ebola cases, and provide public education.

International Mutual Aid remains engaged in healthcare system strengthening efforts in Kono District, Sierra Leone. Kono.

See also
Ebola virus epidemic in West Africa
Ebola virus epidemic in Sierra Leone
Ebola virus epidemic in Guinea
Ebola virus epidemic in Liberia
Ebola virus disease in Mali
Ebola virus disease
Health in Sierra Leone
List of Ebola patients

References

External links
 International Mutual Aid Homepage

2014 establishments in Maryland
2014 establishments in Sierra Leone
Development charities based in the United States
African culture in Maryland
American companies established in 2014
Charities based in Maryland
Harford County, Maryland
Health charities in the United States
Sierra Leonean-American history
Medical and health organizations based in Maryland
Foreign charities operating in Sierra Leone
Organizations based in the Baltimore–Washington metropolitan area